Confessions of a Sexist Pig is a 1998 American independent romantic comedy starring Edward Kerr and Traylor Howard. It was directed and written by Sandy Tung.  It won Best Feature Film at the New Orleans International Film Festival, and the Werner Fassbinder Award at the Mannheim-Heidelberg International Film Festival.

Plot
A daytime soap opera star has to deal with his sexist ideas when he falls for his new co-star, a woman who seemingly follows his manly ideas about dating.

Main cast
Edward Kerr – Jack
Traylor Howard – Anne
Lauren Graham – Tracy
Michael Trucco - Troy
Sal Viscuso – Marty
Anneliza Scott - Linda
Steve Monarque - Steve
Sexist Pig - Derek De Felippo

References

External links

1998 films
American romantic comedy films
1998 romantic comedy films
1990s English-language films
1990s American films